Marcel Pilet-Golaz (31 December 1889 – 11 April 1958) was a Swiss politician. He was elected to the Swiss Federal Council on 13 December 1928 and handed over office on 31 December 1944. He was affiliated to the Free Democratic Party.

During his time in office he held the following departments:
 Department of Home Affairs (1929)
 Department of Posts and Railways (1930–1939)
 Political Department (1940)
 Department of Posts and Railways (1940)
 Political Department (1941–1944)
He was President of the Confederation twice in 1934 and 1940.

Pilet-Golaz was said to be a pragmatic politician who tried to negotiate with the German and Italian fascism. He, therefore, had to face the reproach that he sympathized with fascism.

As the head of the foreign affairs, he had to find a balance between the German requirements, the objections of the Allies and the will of Switzerland to stay independent. His choice to build a relatively good rapport with Nazi Germany was very disputed, during as well as after the war. On 25 June 1940, Pilet-Golaz gave a speech containing numerous references to the coming of an authoritarian regime in Switzerland and to a "new order" in Europe. In September, he met with three representatives of the National Movement of Switzerland (Nationale Bewegung der Schweiz/Mouvement national suisse), the Swiss pro-Nazi party (the MNS was disbanded by the Federal government two months later).

In 1944, when Pilet-Golaz tried to take up relations with the Soviet Union, the latter refused roughly. So he lost all support and had to resign.

Notes and references

 Werner Rings, Die Schweiz im Krieg.

External links
 
 
 
 

1889 births
1958 deaths
People from Morges District
Swiss Calvinist and Reformed Christians
Free Democratic Party of Switzerland politicians
Members of the Federal Council (Switzerland)
Members of the National Council (Switzerland)
World War II political leaders
University of Lausanne alumni
Foreign ministers of Switzerland